Hyegong of Silla (758–780) (r. 765–780) was the 36th ruler of the Korean kingdom of Silla. Being the only child between King Gyeongdeok and Lady Manwol (Queen Gyeongsu), Hyegong was the last descendant of King Muyeol to sit on the throne. Because of this, Hyegong's reign is often regarded as the end of the middle period of the Silla state.

Hyegong became king at the age of 8, and did not adapt well to the role.  According to Samguk Sagi, Hyegong's dissolute life as a young monarch kept the palace in disarray. They faced rebellions led by high officials (Kim Daegong and others) in 768, 770 and 775. Faced in 780 with another rebellion led by his ichan Kim Ji-jeong, the monarch dispatched sangdaedeung Kim Yang-sang to put down the uprising, but the rebel forces managed to storm the palace and assassinated Hyegong and other royal family members. Kim Yang-sang, who was an eleventh-generation descendant of King Naemul, then took the throne as King Seondeok.

Records show that Hyegong's behaviour was effeminate and showed either homosexual or bisexual tendency. Records have traditionally described the monarch as "a man by appearance but a woman by nature". In Dongsa Gangmok, Ahn Jeong-bok described Hyegong's reign as "peculiar, for it was said that the king became a man as a woman, and for the king played with girl's toys as a child." Today's historians often speculate that Hyegong was a trans woman.

Family 

 Grandfather: Seongdeok of Silla (reigned 702–737) (성덕왕)
 Grandmother: Queen Sodeok (소덕왕후 김씨), of the Kim clan
 Father: Gyeongdeok of Silla
 Mother: Queen Gyeongsu, of the Kim clan (경수왕후 김씨)
 Wife: 
Queen Wi, of the Wi clan (신파부인 위씨)
Queen Changchang, of the Kim clan ( 창창부인 김씨), daughter of Kim Jang (김장)

See also
 Unified Silla
 List of Korean monarchs
 List of Silla people

References

Silla rulers
780 deaths
758 births
Korean LGBT people
Medieval LGBT people
LGBT royalty
8th-century Korean monarchs